Tessie Camilleri (6 January 1901 – 2 October 1930) was the first female graduate at the University of Malta.

Life 
Camilleri was born into a well-educated family from Sliema. One of her aunts was an inspector of schools, while three others ran a private school in Valletta. Camilleri entered the University of Malta in October 1919, following courses in English literature, philosophy and Latin literature. She graduated B.Litt on 2 May 1922. She later married Edgar Staines OBE, an administrator at the University of Malta (Secretary to the University Council), with whom she had four children. She died at the age of 29 on 2 October 1930.

The 2 May 1922 edition of the Daily Malta Chronicle reported on her graduation, stating "Miss Camilleri had greatly distinguished herself in the course of literature, revealing intellectual endowments and attainments of no mean order, and we heartily congratulate her on her well-deserved success which has gained for her the distinction of being the first lady graduate of the University of Malta." In 2007, the University of Malta named one of its walkways Vjal Tessie Camilleri in tribute to her.

References 

Maltese women
University of Malta alumni
20th-century Maltese people
1901 births
1930 deaths